This list of people from Darien, Connecticut, includes current and past residents as well as others associated with Darien, Connecticut. The list is categorized by area in which each person is best known, in alphabetical order within each category:

Actors, musicians, and others in entertainment

 Kate Bosworth, actress, starred as Lois Lane in film Superman Returns and as Sandra Dee in biopic Beyond the Sea
 Eddie Bracken, film, Broadway, television and radio star with two stars on the Hollywood Walk of Fame
 Alexandra Breckenridge, actress
 Rose Marie Brown, actress and Miss Virginia (1939)
 Garrett Brown, film and TV actor, appeared in Uncle Buck, The O.C., Cold Case, CSI, The Practice and The Shield
 Eliza Clark, child actress in films and soap operas, grew up in town (sister of Spencer Treat Clark)
 Spencer Treat Clark (born 1987), child actor in films such as Gladiator and Mystic River, grew up in town (brother of Eliza Clark)
 Clint Conley, musician in the band Mission of Burma
 Tom Gammill, Emmy-winning television producer and writer of The Simpsons, Monk, Seinfeld, Futurama, It's Garry Shandling's Show, Late Night with David Letterman, Saturday Night Live
 Topher Grace, actor, star of TV series That '70s Show and films such as Interstellar and Spider-Man 3
 Frank La Forge, pianist and composer
 Frank Latimore, actor, star of 1940s films such as 13 Rue Madeleine and Shock
 Garett Maggart, actor
 Alex Michel, cast member on The Bachelor
 Moby, musician, grew up partly in Darien
 Gerry Mulligan, Grammy Award-winning jazz musician and film music composer; died in Darien
 Christopher Plummer, Oscar-winning actor, former resident (now lives in Weston, Connecticut)
 Chris Risola, American musician and songwriter. He is best known as the original lead guitarist for the glam metal band Steelheart
 Chloë Sevigny, Oscar-nominated, Golden Globe award-winning actress
 Steve-O, comedian; lived in Darien during his early years
 Mark Tinker, multiple Emmy-winning television producer/director, St. Elsewhere, The White Shadow, NYPD Blue, Deadwood, John From Cincinnati
 Gus Van Sant, director of films such as Good Will Hunting and Milk, attended Darien High School
 Steve Wilkos, host of television's Steve Wilkos Show, resident
 Paul Yates, artist, film director, born and raised in Darien

Authors, writers, journalists, photojournalists

 Margaret Bourke-White, late photojournalist, lived in town first with author Erskine Caldwell, then in the same home on Point O'Woods South after their divorce
 Erskine Caldwell, late author, lived in town with Margaret Bourke-White, left her the house when they divorced
 Anne Morrow Lindbergh, late author, wife of Charles Lindbergh
 Rob Morrison, former anchor of CBS 2 News This Morning and CBS 2 News At Noon, resident 
 Robert Newton Peck, author (now lives in Florida)
 Scott Pelley, 60 Minutes correspondent and anchor of the CBS Evening News, resident 
 Joanna Scott, novelist, grew up in town
 Louise Hall Tharp, biographer

Government, military

 Ethan Allen Brown (1776–1852), Ohio governor, U.S. Senator, diplomat, was born on the Fourth of July in town
 Leslie Groves, military head of the Manhattan Project, afterward lived in town
 Stephen Mather, founder and first director of the National Park Service
 Martha Peterson, former operations officer of the United States Central Intelligence Agency
 Christopher Shays, Republican congressman representing Connecticut's Fourth District, born in Darien and a 1964 graduate of Darien High School (now lives in the DC area)
 Ralph E. Van Norstrand (1961), minority leader of the Connecticut General Assembly, 1979—1985; Speaker of the Connecticut House of Representatives, 1985—1987

Business

 Glenn Britt (1949–2014), former CEO of Time Warner 
 Andrew Carnegie, steel magnate and philanthropist, vacationed for several summers at what became the Convent of the Sacred Heart on Long Neck
 Richard Chilton, billionaire, founder, chairman, and CEO of Chilton Investment Company
 Andreas Halvorsen, billionaire, CEO and co-founder of Viking Global Investors
 James B. Lee, Jr. (1952–2015), investment banker, former Vice Chairman of JPMorgan Chase & Co.
 Harold McGraw III, chairman, president and CEO of McGraw-Hill book publishing company, chairman (as of 2006) of the Business Roundtable, an association of CEOs of "leading" U.S. companies
 Walter E. Sachs (1884–1980), partner at Goldman, Sachs & Co.
 Peter Schiff, founder of Euro Pacific capital, former economic advisor to Texas Congressman Ron Paul's 2008 bid for the presidency

Sports

 Brian Cashman, New York Yankees General Manager
 Hugh Jessiman (born 1984), professional hockey player
 Spencer Knight (born 2001), ice hockey goaltender
 Eddie Lopat (1918–1992), Major League Baseball pitcher, lived elsewhere, died at the home of his son in town
 Michael Schwartz, Connecticut Boxing Hall of Fame
 Ryan Shannon, NHL player for Ottawa Senators, traded from Anaheim Ducks after they won the Stanley Cup in 2007

Artists

 Vincent Colyer (1825–1888), artist and humanitarian, lived on Contentment Island
 Gus Edson (1901–1966), cartoonist who drew The Gumps and Dondi
 Helen Frankenthaler (1928–2011), prominent second-generation abstract expressionist 
 Lurelle Guild (1898–1985), industrial designer
 Walt Kelly (1913–1973), cartoonist who drew Pogo
 John Frederick Kensett (1816–1872), luminist, second generation Hudson River School; lived on Contentment Island 
 Ruth Ray (1919–1977), artist who painted in a magical realist style

Others

 Alex Kelly, convicted rapist who fled country to escape charges
 Charles Lindbergh, iconic aviator, husband of Anne Morrow Lindbergh, lived on Tokeneke Trail

See also
 List of people from Connecticut
 List of people from Bridgeport, Connecticut
 List of people from Brookfield, Connecticut
 List of people from Greenwich, Connecticut
 List of people from Hartford, Connecticut
 List of people from New Canaan, Connecticut
 List of people from New Haven, Connecticut
 List of people from Norwalk, Connecticut
 List of people from Redding, Connecticut
 List of people from Ridgefield, Connecticut
 List of people from Stamford, Connecticut
 List of people from Westport, Connecticut

Notes

External links
Internet Movie Database web page for those born in Darien

People from Darien
People from Fairfield County, Connecticut
Darien Connecticut